Jaap Knol (1 December 1896 – 8 October 1975) was a Dutch athlete. He competed in the men's javelin throw at the 1928 Summer Olympics.

References

External links
 

1896 births
1975 deaths
Athletes (track and field) at the 1928 Summer Olympics
Dutch male javelin throwers
Olympic athletes of the Netherlands
People from Uitgeest
Sportspeople from North Holland
20th-century Dutch people